Vasily-Alasa (Bahılay Alaaha) is a rural locality (a selo), and one of three settlements in Ozhulunsky Rural Okrug of Churapchinsky District in the Sakha Republic, Russia, in addition to Dyabyla, the administrative center of the Rural Okrug, and Yuryakh-Kyuyore. Its population as of the 2010 Census was 0; the same as recorded in the 2002 Census.

References

Notes

Sources
Official website of the Sakha Republic. Registry of the Administrative-Territorial Divisions of the Sakha Republic. Churapchinsky District. 

Rural localities in Churapchinsky District